Shankar Ezhumalai, popularly credited by his monicker King Kong is an Indian actor and comedian who has appeared in Tamil language films in supporting roles. A clip from the film Adhisaya Piravi (1990), which features King Kong dancing, has become a viral internet video titled Little Superstar.

Career
King Kong has appeared in Tamil films, primarily portraying comedy supporting roles. He has also appeared in television serials and given stage performances as a dancer. A clip from the film Adhisaya Piravi (1990), featuring King Kong dancing in front of Rajinikanth, became a popular internet viral video in the late 2000s. The clip, dubbed "Little Superstar", features the actor breakdancing to MC Miker G & DJ Sven's "Holiday Rap". The video has been featured on YouTube, in Tom Anderson's bulletins on Myspace, on the E! TV show The Soup, the MSNBC shows Countdown with Keith Olbermann and Tucker Carlson, G4TV's Attack of the Show! and elsewhere, as well as having been parodied on Saturday Night Live.

In 2007, the actor was spotted seeking disability benefits and was reported to be in poverty. He returned to appear in films, notably appearing in a dance sequence in Pokkiri and then as a regular in Vadivelu's comedy tracks in Karuppusamy Kuththagaithaarar (2007) and Kanthaswamy (2009). The actor began working on a low-budget bilingual Tamil and Malayalam film titled Onnara Kullan in the lead role opposite softcore actress Shakeela, but the film remains unreleased. In recent years, actor King Kong has choreographed a dance number in a Doritos Tandoori Sizzler! commercial shown in Canada, which was filmed in India. He also made an appearance in British comedian Romesh Ranganathan's BBC Three show Asian Provocateur during October 2015 and appeared in an in-episode short film.

Selected filmography

References

Living people
Male actors in Tamil cinema
21st-century Indian male actors
Indian male film actors
Tamil male actors
Tamil comedians
Indian male comedians
1971 births